Jonathan Huberdeau (born June 4, 1993) is a Canadian professional ice hockey winger and an alternate captain for the Calgary Flames of the National Hockey League (NHL). Huberdeau was selected third overall by the Florida Panthers in the 2011 NHL Entry Draft and made his NHL debut with the team in 2013.

Playing career

Junior
Huberdeau played Midget AAA hockey with the Ste. Eustache Vikings of the Quebec Midget League. He led the league in scoring during the 2008–09 season. After his performance, he was drafted in the first round, 18th overall, in the 2009 Quebec Major Junior Hockey League (QMJHL) Midget draft by the Saint John Sea Dogs. He scored a goal in his first QMJHL game, against the Acadie–Bathurst Titan. Huberdeau was the leading scorer among 16-year-olds in the QMJHL for the 2009–10 season, and scored on all six of his shootout attempts. In January 2010, he was named the QMJHL's scholastic player of the month. The Sea Dogs reached the QMJHL finals during Huberdeau's rookie season.

Prior to the start of the 2010–11 season, Huberdeau was 1 of 33 prospects selected to attend the NHL Research, Development and Orientation Camp in August. The prospects were invited to participate to try out potential rule changes the NHL was considering, and also to be briefed with information on security and professionalism to assist with their future careers in the public eye.

Huberdeau was considered a solid prospect for the 2011 NHL Entry Draft at the start of the 2010–11 QMJHL season, and his strong play helped him move up the rankings. He scored 43 goals and added 62 assists in 67 games for the Sea Dogs. At the end of the 2010–11 season, NHL Central Scouting ranked him third among North American skaters, moving up one spot from the mid-season rankings. Ahead of the NHL draft, Russian-based club Vityaz Chekhov made Huberdeau the fifth overall selection in the 2011 Kontinental Hockey League (KHL) Junior Draft. After being informed of his selection, Huberdeau said, "For sure, I don't want to go there. I didn't talk to anybody about that."
 
The Sea Dogs captured the 2011 QMJHL championship and represented the league at the 2011 Memorial Cup. At the Memorial Cup tournament, the Sea Dogs earned a bye to the final game after victories in their first two round-robin games. In the final against the Mississauga Majors, Huberdeau recorded a goal and an assist, helping the Sea Dogs to a 3–1 victory. He was awarded the Stafford Smythe Memorial Trophy as the tournament's Most Valuable Player, and was named to the tournament's All-Star Team.
  
Huberdeau was nominated for three QMJHL awards at the end of the season, including the Michel Brière Memorial Trophy for Most Valuable Player, the Mike Bossy Trophy as top professional prospect and the Paul Dumont Trophy as the QMJHL's personality of the year. He did not win any of the awards – Sean Couturier was named MVP and top prospect, while Louis Leblanc captured the award for personality of the year. Huberdeau was named to the league's First All-Star Team.

Professional

Florida Panthers (2013–2022)
On September 20, 2011, playing in his second NHL pre-season game for the Florida Panthers, Huberdeau scored a goal against the Nashville Predators. He played five pre-season games with the Panthers, tallying three goals and one assist to lead the team in pre-season scoring before being sent back to Saint John on October 3.

Following the conclusion of the 2012–13 NHL lockout, Huberdeau made the Panthers starting roster for the 2012–13 season. He scored his first NHL goal on January 19, 2013, against Cam Ward of the Carolina Hurricanes on the second shift and first shot of his NHL career. Huberdeau would add two assists in the 5–1 victory to earn the first star of the game in his NHL debut. NHL regulations allowed the Panthers to keep Huberdeau in their lineup for a maximum of five games before they could either return him to his junior team or keep him in Florida. On January 28, 2013, after registering a goal and two assists in five games, the Panthers announced Huberdeau would remain with the Panthers for the remainder of the NHL season. As a result of his outstanding rookie season, Huberdeau won the 2013 Calder Memorial Trophy.

In the 2014–15 season, Huberdeau scored a career-high 15 goals and 39 assists (54 points) in 77 games played. After Florida's late-season acquisition of forward Jaromír Jágr from the New Jersey Devils, who was placed on Florida's top line alongside Huberdeau and Aleksander Barkov, Huberdeau recorded 6 goals and 15 assists (21 points) in 20 games played to finish the season. Huberdeau's assists total (39) was the most for a Panther since Stephen Weiss in 2008–09. At the conclusion of the season, Huberdeau was set to become a restricted free agent.

On September 6, 2016, the Panthers signed Huberdeau to a six-year, $35.4 million contract averaging $5.9 million per season. Panthers president of hockey operations Dale Tallon spoke very highly of Huberdeau after the signing, saying, "Jonathan is a highly talented and dynamic player who is another important piece of our team's young core. In each of his last two seasons, he has posted over 50 points and has developed into a key component of our team's offense."

On November 16, 2019, Huberdeau surpassed Stephen Weiss to become the all-time leader for the Florida Panthers in assists.

On April 1, 2022, Huberdeau picked up his 71st assist in the Panthers' 4–0 win over the Chicago Blackhawks. In doing so, he surpassed Joé Juneau's previous NHL record (70) for most assists in a single season by a left-winger.

On April 5, 2022, Huberdeau became the first Panthers player to reach 100 points in a season in the Panthers' 7–6 comeback win against the Toronto Maple Leafs, with Huberdeau scoring the overtime goal.

Calgary Flames (2022–present)
On July 22, 2022, Huberdeau, along with MacKenzie Weegar, Cole Schwindt, and a 2025 conditional first-round draft pick, were traded to the Calgary Flames for Matthew Tkachuk and a conditional fourth-round draft pick. On August 3, Huberdeau signed an eight-year, $84 million contract extension with the Flames. It was the largest contract in Flames' franchise history, surpassing Sean Monahan's $44.625 million contract signed in 2016.

International play

Huberdeau's first experience with Hockey Canada came when he represented Team Quebec at the 2010 World U-17 Hockey Challenge. He scored two goals and added a single assist in five games. He represented Canada at the 2010 Ivan Hlinka Memorial Tournament, recording three assists as Canada captured the gold medal.

Huberdeau continued his international success by representing Canada at the 2012 World Junior Ice Hockey Championships. He scored one goal and four assists in Canada's 8–1 victory over Finland to open the tournament.

Personal life
Huberdeau was born and raised in Saint-Jérôme, Quebec. Huberdeau's first language is French, but he chose to attend an English-speaking high school, to better prepare himself for the NHL.
Huberdeau's parents are both French, and they moved to Canada a couple of years before his birth. Although Huberdeau is from the Montreal area, he and his family would take their RV to Florida each winter. Because of this, Huberdeau would grow up attending more Florida Panthers than Montreal Canadiens games.

Career statistics

Regular season and playoffs

International

Awards and honours

References

External links

1993 births
Living people
Calder Trophy winners
Calgary Flames players
Canadian ice hockey left wingers
Florida Panthers draft picks
Florida Panthers players
French Quebecers
Ice hockey people from Quebec
National Hockey League first-round draft picks
People from Saint-Jérôme
Saint John Sea Dogs players